Park Forest is a village located south of Chicago in Cook County, Illinois, with a small southern portion in Will County, Illinois, United States. The village was originally designed as a planned community for veterans returning from World War II. As of the 2020 census, the village had a population of 21,687. Park Forest has multiple public and private schools. In addition to the arts and culture scene including Tall Grass Arts Association and the Illinois Theatre Center, residents also have access to a myriad of recreational opportunities for both children and adults such as the Park Forest Aqua Center. Notable people from Park Forest include the former artistic director of the Illinois Theatre Center, Etel Billig. Park Forest is bordered by Olympia Fields to the north, Chicago Heights to the east, University Park to the south, and Richton Park and Matteson to the west.

History 
Developers Nathan Manilow, Carroll F. Sweet and Philip M. Klutznick held a press conference in the Palmer House in Chicago on October 28, 1946, to announce the planned development of a new self-governing community in Chicago's south suburbs. This project, soon to be referred to as Park Forest, was to be developed by American Community Builders (ACB). The village of Park Forest was partly designed by town planner Elbert Peets in the tradition of planned communities around the nation to provide housing for veterans returning from World War II.

Studs Terkel, in his oral history of World War II, The Good War, says Park Forest and other such middle-class suburbs grew out of the new prosperity after the war.  First he quotes an unnamed GI, "The war changed our whole idea of how we wanted to live when we came back.  We set our sights pretty high.  . . . I am now what you'd call middle class."  Terkel goes on:  "The suburb, until [about 1946], had been the exclusive domain of the 'upper class.'  It was where the rich lived.  The rest of us were neighborhood folk.  At war's end, a new kind of suburb came into being. . . . Thanks to the GI bill, two new names were added to American folksay: Levittown and Park Forest.

"A new middle class had emerged.  Until now, the great many, even before the Depression, had had to scuffle from one payday to the next. . . . [Before there had only been one] car on the block.  Now everybody was getting a car.  Oh, it was exciting.  (Terkel, p. 12)"

Park Forest was honored in 1954 as an "All-America City" for its citizens' help in the creation of Rich Township High School, on Sauk Trail. It was awarded this same honor again in 1976 for open housing and racial integration and initiatives. A village landmark was the Park Forest Plaza, an outdoor regional shopping center of over 50 stores and restaurants which included Sears, Marshall Fields and Goldblatt's.

In 1956, William H. Whyte, an editor at Fortune magazine, published a book called The Organization Man that defined the nature of corporate life for a generation. The book described how America (whose people, he said, had "led in the public worship of individualism") had recently turned into a nation of employees who "take the vows of organization life" and who had become "the dominant members of our society". Park Forest was one of the communities that figured most prominently in Whyte's study of the home life of "the organization man," and should be read by anyone seeking an insight into early Park Forest.

In 1951 and 1957, synagogues opened in Park Forest as Jews became 15% of the population. By 2013, both synagogues had moved outside the town. Although officially desegregated from its inception, Park Forest's first African-American family took residence there in 1959.

Park Forest is known for the "Scenic 10", a  race held annually on Labor Day that attracts runners from around the globe. In 2008, the race was shortened to a  course to attract more local runners and renamed the "Scenic Five".

On March 26, 2003, a meteor exploded over the Midwest, showering Park Forest with dozens of meteorite fragments. These fragments are currently on display at the Field Museum in Chicago. For further reading see Park Forest (meteorite).

Geography 

The village is generally bounded by U.S. Highway 30 on the north, Western Avenue on the east, Central Park Avenue on the west and Thorn Creek on the south. Parts of Park Forest are east of Western Avenue, however, including a subdivision called "Eastgate". Park Forest is bisected by the Elgin, Joliet and Eastern Railway (now the Canadian National Railway) double-track main line, which was paralleled a little further north by the Michigan Central (New York Central) railroad. That rail line has been converted to a nature trail called Old Plank Trail. The beginning of the trail is at Western Avenue, and it runs through Park Forest west to Joliet.

Climate

Transportation 
Metra operates commuter railroad service to downtown Chicago. Stations bordering Park Forest include Richton Park (Sauk Trail at Governor's Hwy./Crawford Ave./Pulaski Rd.,) 211th Street (Lincoln Highway) and Matteson stations on the Metra Electric Line, which runs parallel to the Illinois Central Railroad Company (owned by Canadian National Railway Company) but on its own closely adjacent tracks

Demographics 
As of the 2020 census there were 21,687 people, 8,179 households, and 4,738 families residing in the village. The racial makeup of the village was 70.18% African American, 18.83% White, 0.25% Native American, 0.76% Asian, 0.04% Pacific Islander, 3.39% from other races, and 6.55% from two or more races. Hispanic or Latino of any race were 7.76% of the population.

There were 8,179 households, out of which 45.79% had children under the age of 18 living with them, 31.32% were married couples living together, 23.13% had a female householder with no husband present, and 42.07% were non-families. 39.47% of all households were made up of individuals, and 15.91% had someone living alone who was 65 years of age or older. The average household size was 3.38 and the average family size was 2.46.

The village's age distribution consisted of 22.9% under the age of 18, 7.0% from 18 to 24, 29.8% from 25 to 44, 25.2% from 45 to 64, and 15.1% who were 65 years of age or older. The median age was 39.4 years. For every 100 females, there were 87.7 males. For every 100 females age 18 and over, there were 78.0 males.

The median income for a household in the village was $56,393, and the median income for a family was $65,507. Males had a median income of $41,744 versus $40,219 for females. The per capita income for the village was $26,078. About 5.8% of families and 12.6% of the population were below the poverty line, including 10.7% of those under age 18 and 13.3% of those age 65 or over.

Note: the US Census treats Hispanic/Latino as an ethnic category. This table excludes Latinos from the racial categories and assigns them to a separate category. Hispanics/Latinos can be of any race.

Government
Park Forest is in Illinois's 2nd congressional district.

Local Government:

Presidents/Mayors of Park Forest:

Dennis O'Harrow	        04/23/1949-10/10/1950
Henry X. Dietch	                10/10/1950-04/26/1955
Robert A. Dinerstein	        04/26/1955-04/22/1961
Bernard G. Cunningham	04/22/1961-04/00/1971
Ralph G. Johnson	        04/00/1971-04/00/1975
Mayer Singerman	        04/00/1975-04/00/1981
Ronald Bean	                04/00/1981-09/02/1986
Jerry Mathews	                09/29/1986-04/00/1991
F. Patrick Kelly	                04/00/1991-04/00-1999
John Ostenburg	                04/00/1999–05/06/2019
Jonathan Vanderbilt            05/06/2019–Present

Education

School districts serving Park Forest include:

 Matteson School District 162
Park Forest Chicago Heights School District 163
Rich Township High School District 227
The Rich Township High School District 227 have voted to close Rich East High School. The students would be relocated to the other two Rich high schools Central and South.
Crete-Monee School District 201U

Schools
 21st Century Primary Center
 Michelle Obama School Of Technology And The Arts
 Blackhawk Primary Center
 Mohawk Primary Center
 Illinois Middle School
 Indiana Middle School
 Talala Elementary Center-Closed
Algonquin Pre-Kindergarten Center
Illinois Montessori Children's House-Closed
South Suburban Sda Christian School
Rich Township High School
Rich East High School
Rich South High School
Rich Central High School

Arts and culture

The Illinois Theatre Center 
The Illinois Theatre Center was established in 1976 by Steve and Etel Billig. At its inception, it was located in Park Forest's public library but was later moved to Downtown Park Forest in 1999. In addition to the main stage series of six plays, the theatre offers programs like The Drama School which provides acting classes for children, teens and adults.

Freedom Hall Performing Arts Theatre 
Freedom Hall Performing Arts Theatre is a performing arts theatre and concert hall situated in Park Forest, Illinois. It offers a variety of concerts and theatre performances. Since the opening of Park Forest’s Cultural Arts Center in 1976, Freedom Hall Nathan Manilow Theatre has presented performance arts in the form of theater groups, recitals, lecture events, etc.

The Nathan Manilow Theatre has 287 seats. This theatre has presented a variety of events of all genres for more than thirty years. Such shows include Tom Dreessen, C.J Chenier, The Chicago City Ballet, The National Theatre of the Deaf, Joseph Holmes Chicago Dance Theatre, Tom Chapin, Muntu Dance Theatre of Chicago, Corky Siegel, George Winston, The Second City Touring Company, John Houseman, Peter Mayer and many other performances. The goal of such performances is to present the finest cultural events for the Park Forest community and other residents of the Chicago area.

Museum Home 
The 1950s Park Forest House Museum is meant to replicate an original home. It was built in 1947-1949 and now stands as a house has remained furnished the same way it originally was back in the years of 1948-1953, just as it was during the first five years that it was occupied by tenants. Visiting this site provides people with the ability to uniquely experience the history of Park Forest, a suburb built after the conclusion of World War II. Initially designed to help veterans and their families returning from the war, it would later become an attraction for enthusiasts of the era.

Visitors can open drawers, cupboards, and closets containing period treasures. Consistent with the way the house was furnished, dolls, toys, built-in bookcases and even a collection of clothes from that period may be found. One of the rooms even recreates a classroom from the very first school in the town.

Tall Grass Arts Association 
Tall Grass Arts Association is located in downtown Park Forest Cultural Center; the Tall Grass Arts Association operates a regional art gallery where juried artists are invited to participate in the annual fine arts fair held in September in downtown Park Forest. Artists can display their work in the gallery at least once a year in addition to including their work in the Tall Grass Gift Shop.

Gallery Gift Shop 
The Tall Grass Arts Association Gift Shop is a gift shop where juried artists display their works and make them available for the public. Their works include mixed media, ceramics, glass, metals, etc.

Recreations 
Park Forest offers a variety of recreational services to its residents and surrounding neighborhoods including the Park Forest Aqua Center, the Park Forest Tennis and Health Club, and park district classes and sports teams.

Park Forest Aqua Center 
Park Forest Aqua Center has been a neighborhood institution since 1952. Both seasonal memberships and daily passes are available. Patrons can enjoy a beach pool for toddlers, the 160-foot water slide, 2 drop slides, a 15-foot aquatic climbing wall, and the East Pool, which is designed for adults to swim laps. Additionally, the Aqua Center also has a sand area and a concession stand.

Summer season opens to the public in the beginning of June and ends on Labor Day. Throughout the season, the Aqua Center offers special events, such as Members Only Kickoff, Hawaiian Night, Glow Swim, and Carnival Night. The Aqua Center also offers the following swim lesson programs:

 Preschool + Parent
 Preschool
 Beginner
 Advanced Beginner
 Intermediate
 Advanced
 Adult
 Water Aerobics
 Junior Lifeguards

Park Forest Aqua Center Contact Information 
30 N. Orchard

Park Forest, IL 60466

Contact

708-747-9490 (in season)

708-748-2005 (off season)

Park Forest Tennis and Health Club 
For over thirty years, the Park Forest Tennis and Health Club has offered residents a place to play tennis and workout. In addition to six indoor tennis courts and a fitness area, the Club also has saunas in the locker rooms, a courtside lounge, professional tennis instructors, racquet stringing, and a pro shop.

The Tennis and Health Club offers multiple types of tennis lessons. Group lessons are available for children and adults. The Club also offers private lessons and the Junior Excellence program, which is available to junior high and high school students who are interested in competing.

Park Forest Tennis and Health Club Contact Information 
290 West wood Drive

Park Forest, IL 60466

708-481-6060

Park District Programs 
The Park Forest Park District runs seasonal programs open to both residents and non-residents and includes a variety of programs for all ages. The Park District offers sports, health & wellness, and dance programs, in addition to special day trips and art classes.

Department of Recreation, Parks & Community Health Contact Information 
Village Hall

350 Victory Drive

Park Forest, IL 60466

Phone: 708-748-2005

Fax: 708-503-8561

Architecture 
In celebration of the 2018 Illinois Bicentennial, the Park Forest was selected as one of the Illinois 200 Great Places by the American Institute of Architects Illinois component (AIA Illinois).

Notable people 

Etel Billig
   Born 12-16-1932  Died March 28, 2012
Etel Billing was featured in films such as Running Scared, Stolen Summer, and Straight Talk. She was a long time resident of Park Forest Illinois. During her residency, she was the Artistic Director of the Illinois Theatre Center.

Kim Thayil

   Birth-9-4-1960
Kim Thayil is one of the founding members of the popular grunge band Soundgarden. Thayil attended Rich East Highschool in Park Forest, Illinois. He attended the highschool with Hiro Yamamoto, the bassist for Soundgarden. After which he moved to Washington state for college before moving to California.

Hiro Yamamoto

  Birth -4-13-1961
Hiro Yamamoto the bass player for Soundgarden attended Rich East High School in Park Forest Illinois along with the lead guitarist Kim Thayil After which both went to college in Washington State until moving to California and pairing up with Soundgarden's lead singer Chris Cornel.

Berry Oakley

  Born 4-4-1948 Died Nov, 11, 1972
Berry Oakley was the bassist for the popular band The Allman Brothers. Oakley grew up in Chicago suburb Park Forest. After his younger years in Park Forest he moved to Florida where he aligned with other founding members of the Allman Brothers.

See also 

Sauk Trail Woods
Thorn Creek
Matteson, Illinois
Richton Park, Illinois

References

External links 

"Park Forest, IL" entry in the Encyclopedia of Chicago
 Park Forest
Society of Architectural Historians SAH ARCHIPEDIA entry on Park Forest
Cooley, Will, "'We Just Can’t Afford to Be Democratic': Liberals, Integrationists, and the Postwar Suburb of Park Forest," Journal of Social History, 

 
Chicago metropolitan area
Planned cities in the United States
Villages in Cook County, Illinois
Villages in Will County, Illinois
Villages in Illinois
Populated places established in 1946
1946 establishments in Illinois
Majority-minority cities and towns in Cook County, Illinois
Majority-minority cities and towns in Will County, Illinois